Youssef Ibrahim (born 2 December 1995), nicknamed Youssef Obama, is an Egyptian professional footballer who plays as a midfielder for Saudi Arabian club Al-Hazem on loan from Zamalek.

A product of the Zamalek youth system, he made his debut for the club in the Egyptian Premier League in 2014. He was sent out on loan twice between 2015 and 2016, with Al Ittihad and Wadi Degla, before returning to Zamalek.

Career
Obama began his career with Zamalek, being promoted from the under-23 squad to the first team in July 2014 by manager Mido. He was given the nickname Obama due to his resemblance to former U.S. President Barack Obama. In 2015, he joined Al Ittihad on a season long loan deal, along with teammate Ahmed Samir. He scored seven goals in 31 appearances to finish the season as the club's top goalscorer. 

During his loan spell with Al Ittihad, Obama missed the funeral of his mother in order to play for the club. Having learned of his mother's death hours before a match against El Entag El Harby, he decided to remain with the squad and scored the winning goal in the match before breaking down in tears during his celebration. He later commented, "I wanted to follow my mother’s wishes not to leave my team for any reason." Obama attracted worldwide attention for his reaction to missing a penalty during an Egyptian Premier League match while on loan with Al Ittihad. After seeing his penalty saved, Obama ran straight off the pitch and into the tunnel forcing manager Mokhtar Mokhtar to make a substitution as he failed to return to the pitch.

The following year was sent out on loan again with Wadi Degla, scoring twice in fourteen appearances. After returning to Zamalek, Obama agreed a transfer to Portuguese side C.D. Feirense following the expiration of his contract. However, the transfer was later cancelled and he signed a new four-year contract with Zamalek.

Zamalek 
On August 27, 2017, Obama debuted for Zamalek against Haras El Hodoud SC. He got Shikabala's number 10.

On May 21, 2018, Obama scored the last penalty that marked the defeat of Smouha in the 2018 Egypt Cup final, which Zamalek won after beating Smouha 5-4 on penalties in the final match.

Obama signed a new four-year contract with Zamalek.

On July 31, 2019, Obama decided to hand his number 10 to Shikabala in the new season. His new number became 14.

On January 02, 2021, Obama scored a goal in Zamalek's victory over Enppi, with two goals to one at Petrosport Stadium in the fifth round of the Egyptian League.

On January 9, 2021, Obama scored his goal in the 17th minute in the match against Tala'ea El Gaish SC, which ended with Zamalek's 3-0 victory at Al-Jaish Stadium in Suez.

On January 19, 2021, the Zamalek team succeeded in occupying the top of the Egyptian League after beating El Gouna 1-0, the goal was scored by Youssef Obama in the 10th minute of the match that was held between the two teams at Petrosport Stadium.

On January 28, 2021, Obama scored two goals, in Zamalek's victory over Misr Lel Makkasa SC, in the tenth round of the Egyptian League.

On 23 January 2023, Obama joined Saudi Arabian club Al-Hazem on loan.

Honours
Zamalek 

(12 titles)
Egyptian Premier League (3): 2014-2015, 2020–21, 2021-22

Egypt Cup (5): 2013–14, 2014–15, 2017–18, 2018–2019 , 2021
Egyptian Super Cup: 2019–20
Saudi-Egyptian Super Cup: 2018
CAF Confederation Cup: 2018–19
CAF Super Cup: 2020

References

 

1995 births
Living people
Zamalek SC players
Al Ittihad Alexandria Club players
Wadi Degla SC players
Al-Hazem F.C. players
Egyptian Premier League players
Saudi First Division League players
Association football midfielders
Egyptian footballers
Egyptian expatriate footballers
Egyptian expatriate sportspeople in Saudi Arabia
Expatriate footballers in Saudi Arabia